Gonzalo López-Fabero (born 29 May 1970) is a Spanish tennis coach and former professional player.

A right-handed player from Barcelona, López-Fabero reached a career high ranking of 169 in the world. 

López-Fabero twice competed in the qualifying draws at Wimbledon and in 1994 won a Challenger tournament in Seville, beating Paolo Canè in the final. His only ATP Tour main draw appearance came in the doubles at the 1994 Croatia Open, where he partnered with Juan Albert Viloca.

Since 1998 has worked in tennis coaching and has been the personal coach of several players, including Julián Alonso, Teymuraz Gabashvili, Evgeny Donskoy and Jesse Levine.

Challenger titles

Singles: (1)

References

External links
 
 

1970 births
Living people
Spanish male tennis players
Tennis players from Barcelona